Puka Mayu (Quechua puka red, mayu river, "red river") is a Bolivian river in the Cochabamba Department, Capinota Province, Capinota Municipality. It is a tributary of the Caine River.

References

Rivers of Cochabamba Department